The following tables show state-by-state results in the Australian House of Representatives at the 2016 federal election, Coalition 76, Labor 69, Australian Greens 1, Nick Xenophon Team 1, Katter's Australian Party 1, with 2 independents.

A number of initially-elected senators were declared ineligible a result of the 2017–18 Australian parliamentary eligibility crisis, and replaced after recounts.

Australia

New South Wales

Victoria

Queensland

Western Australia

South Australia

Tasmania

This is a list of electoral division results for the 2016 Australian federal election in the state of Tasmania.

Territories

Australian Capital Territory

Northern Territory

Two party preferred preference flow

See also
 Results of the 2016 Australian federal election (Senate)
 Post-election pendulum for the 2016 Australian federal election
 Members of the Australian House of Representatives, 2016–2019

References

2016 Australian federal election
House of Representatives 2016